Gloucester Rugby are a professional rugby union club based in the West Country city of Gloucester, England. They play in Premiership Rugby, England's top division of rugby, as well as in the European Rugby Champions Cup.

The club was formed in 1873 and since 1891 has played its home matches at Kingsholm Stadium, on the fringes of the city centre. Their biggest successes are winning the Anglo-Welsh Cup five times: in 1971–72, 1977–78, 1981–82, 2002–03 and 2010–11; and the European Challenge Cup twice: in 2005–06 and 2014–15.

The club has no official nickname but are often referred to as the Cherry and Whites by supporters and the media in reference to the traditional Cherry and white hooped shirts worn by the team. Matches with local rivals Bath and Bristol Bears are referred to as West Country derbies.

History

Formation & Early Years
The club was formed in 1873 after a meeting at the Spread Eagle Hotel with the announcement in the Gloucester Journal: "A football club (as rugby was then called) has been formed in this city – the season's operations begin at the Spa on the first Tuesday in next month." a team was then organised to play the college school, which was actually played on the current Kingsholm ground.

The club left the Spa after an argument with the cricket club that they were ground sharing with. During the winter, the Rugby Club had used a salt mixture to remove frost from the pitch, resulting in the death of the grass on the wicket. Gloucester were no longer welcome at the Spa ground. They then acquired lands from the Castle Grim Estate for £4,000 in 1891 & have played home fixtures at this site ever since, in the area known as Kingsholm.

Continued Successes & the Dawn of Professionalism
In 1972, Gloucester RFC won the first-ever National Knock-Out Competition. Having beaten Bath, Bristol, London Welsh and Coventry (all away from home) in earlier rounds, they beat Moseley in a Twickenham final that was marred by violence and the sending off of Moseley's Nigel Horton.

In 1978, Gloucester RFC won the first ever John Player Cup, defeating Leicester Tigers in another final noted for violent play both on and off the pitch at Twickenham Stadium.

Despite the two cup wins of the 1970s, and a shared trophy in 1982, Gloucester were soon to find themselves in the shadow of Bath, the rising force from down the A46.

In 1989, Gloucester came close to winning the 'double' but failed to win either competition, losing to Wasps for the league title and losing the cup final 48–6 to Bath.

Professionalism finally came in 1995, but Gloucester was without a major investor, and lost ground in terms of player recruitment and revenue acquisition. But this did not prevent the club from transforming itself into a limited company.

The Early Professional Era
Tom Walkinshaw bought the club in 1997. After two full seasons at the helm, Richard Hill was replaced as director of rugby by former France captain Philippe Saint-André.

In 1999–2000, a third-place finish took Gloucester into the Heineken Cup. With Phil Vickery, Trevor Woodman, Kingsley Jones and All Blacks legend Ian Jones forming the basis of a formidable pack, Gloucester Rugby reached the semi-finals.

In 2003, Gloucester won their first cup in 25 years, under new coach Nigel Melville.

During the 2002–03 season, Gloucester finished the league in first place, 15 points ahead of the next best club. Under the new Premiership playoff system, Gloucester Rugby were required to play a single knock-out match to determine the Premiership champions. Despite a significant rest period of three weeks, Gloucester lost the final to Wasps and have thus never been crowned English domestic champions. Nigel Melville left the club and was replaced by Dean Ryan for the 2005–06 season.

At the start of the 2005 season, owner Tom Walkinshaw made several changes to modernise the club. 'Gloucester Rugby Football Club' was renamed 'Gloucester Rugby' and, due to copyright issues, no longer used the City Coat of Arms as the club's crest (as the crest didn't belong to the club, so unofficial merchandise was freely available).

The 2005–06 season saw an improvement in the club's fortunes, although they did not qualify for the play-offs, they were strong contenders and lost out on the last day of the regular season. They also won silverware in the European Challenge Cup, defeating London Irish in a tense final that went into extra time.

Gloucester Rugby finished 1st in the 2006–07 Guinness Premiership table. Both Leicester and Gloucester Rugby tied with 71 points, but Gloucester Rugby gained first place with more games won. Gloucester Rugby defeated Saracens in the semi-final at Kingsholm, 50–9, and faced Leicester Tigers in the final. Gloucester lost 44–16.

2008–Present
Martin St Quinton, an office equipment and telecoms entrepreneur  acquired 25% of the club in 2008, and became vice chairman, with a focus on increasing sponsorship and other non-playing related areas.

Gloucester Rugby began the 2007–08 Guinness Premiership campaign as favourites, and came top of the league to book a place in the play-off semi-final at Kingsholm. Leicester Tigers won the match 25–26, marking Gloucester's third Premiership play-off defeat.

Gloucester reached the EDF Energy Cup Final in the 2008–09 season, losing to Cardiff at Twickenham.

On 11 June 2009, Dean Ryan left Gloucester by mutual consent and was replaced by Bryan Redpath as their new head coach.

Tragedy struck the club on 12 December 2010, when popular club owner Tom Walkinshaw died from cancer at the age of 64. David McKnight was appointed non-executive chairman in April 2011, who guided Tom's son Ryan, who inherited the club. A memorial service held at Gloucester Cathedral for Tom was attended by hundreds of fans.

Gloucester won the Anglo-Welsh cup in the 2010–11 season, beating Newcastle Falcons 34–7 in the final at Franklins' Gardens. They also made the Premiership play-offs this season, losing in the Semi-final to Saracens at Vicarage Road.

On 17 April 2012, Bryan Redpath announced his resignation as Gloucester head coach with immediate effect, months before the end of the 2011–12 season. In June 2012, Gloucester announced former Scarlets coach Nigel Davies as their new director of rugby.

On 13 November 2012, Gloucester hosted an International match against Fiji as part of the 2012 Autumn Internationals. The match was held at Kingsholm Stadium and Gloucester won 31–29. On 12 November 2013, Gloucester hosted an International match against Japan, as part of the 2013 Autumn Internationals. Gloucester won 40–5.

After two poor seasons towards the end of the 2013–14 season, Nigel Davies departed Gloucester with immediate effect. On 7 June 2014, Gloucester appointed David Humphreys as their new director of rugby, with Brumbies coach Laurie Fisher confirmed as their head coach as of July 2014. During the 2014–15 season, Gloucester won the European Rugby Challenge Cup at Twickenham Stoop, beating Edinburgh 19–13 in the final.

In 2016, Martin St Quinton acquired 100% full ownership of the club to become new chairman of Gloucester Rugby with immediate effect.

On 6 March 2017, Laurie Fisher left Gloucester by mutual consent before the end of the 2016–17 season. On 3 April 2017, he was replaced by Lions coach Johan Ackermann as Gloucester's new head coach. During the 2016–17 season, Gloucester reach the final of the European Rugby Challenge Cup, losing 17–25 to Stade Francais at Murrayfield. During the 2017–18 season, Gloucester reach the final of the European Rugby Challenge Cup, marking three European finals in four seasons, but lost to Cardiff 31–30 at San Mames Stadium, Bilbao.

On 15 May 2020, Johan Ackermann announced his departure from Gloucester to become the new head coach at NTT DoCoMo Red Hurricanes based in Japan. On 2 June 2020, David Humphreys announced he will leave Gloucester after six seasons as their director of rugby, a month after Ackermann's departure.

On 27 June 2020, Gloucester announced London Irish Forwards Coach George Skivington as their new head coach, with Alex Brown promoted to the position of Chief Operating Officer. This means Skivington handles the playing side of his new job whilst Brown focuses on rugby related matters like recruitment and regulatory issues at Gloucester.

Stadium
Gloucester Rugby play home matches at Kingsholm Stadium. The club left the Spa Ground for Kingsholm when it bought an area of the Castle Grim Estate for £4,000 in 1891. In that year, Gloucester Rugby Football Club opened the "Sixpenny" stand, which later became known as the Shed.

Kingsholm's capacity was further increased to 20,000 in 1926 when a grandstand was added to the stadium at a cost of £2,500, containing 1,750 seats. However, six years later, it was destroyed by fire. There were plans proposed to increase the seating capacity of the stadium to 7,000. However, it remained a proposal, although the grandstand was replaced, terracing in the Sixpenny, and at the Tummp end was preferred, and indeed, more affordable in the early 20th century.

Like the clubs of the Welsh mining valleys, Gloucester Rugby traditionally drew its support and its playing strength from local working-class communities. The Shed, so-called because it looks like a cow shed, became known as such in the 1950s. Gloucester Rugby's fanzine, 'Shed Head' refers to it as 'the cauldron of fear'. The Shed is standing-only terracing that runs continuously down one touchline, opposite the point where visiting teams emerge from the dressing rooms. Its low tin roof amplifies the effect of a passionate support which has been mentioned by commentators sitting above it during live broadcasts. This, together with a historically good home record, contributes to the ground also being nicknamed 'Castle Grim'.

In October 2003, Gloucester Rugby launched 'Project Kingsholm'. 'The Kingsholm Supporters Mutual' (KSM) was set up by Gloucester Rugby Football Club in October 2003, to help fundraise towards 'Project Kingsholm', the redevelopment of Gloucester's entire ground at a cost of £6,000,000, and the launch of a supporters shares rights issue. The idea was to be similar to the development at Franklins Gardens, home of Northampton Saints RFC, although on a bigger scale, incorporating both seating and terracing. Despite the KSM meeting the fundraising targets, Gloucester Rugby abandoned all plans.

In 2006, the club announced it would be making an extension to Kingsholm, bringing the stadium capacity up to 16,500. This was mainly to comply with Premier Rugby's minimum seat number requirements. The old main Grandstand (which was both terracing and seating) was later replaced by a new all seater structure, while terracing on the Worcester Street end of the ground was developed into an all seater stand, known as the 'Buildbase' stand at the time.

In January 2007, the club announced plans to redevelop The Shed terracing to all seater. This was intended to enable the entire stadium to become all-seating. A large number of supporters did not want to see this happen under the proposals put forward by Gloucester Rugby, and a poster campaign under the name of 'Save Our Shed' or 'SOS' was initiated by the Gloucester Citizen newspaper. Posters were held up by supporters standing in the Shed, on camera during a televised Heineken Cup match against Leinster at Kingsholm. T-shirts were also made independently by supporters, with the slogan 'Save Our Shed' printed on them. The campaign did not protest the redevelopment of the Shed, rather the plans put forward at the time, which were to replace all terracing with seats, leaving no alternative anywhere in the ground, despite such a large demand for terracing.

In September 2008, chairman Tom Walkinshaw confirmed there were plans for the Shed to be redeveloped, but it would remain as a terrace (with an increased capacity of 6,000), with hospitality units above it. However, as of the 2010–11 season, the need and desire for redeveloping the Shed decreased with the above-mentioned plans proving to be conjecture, and as such abandoned, have never come into effect and do not appear to for the foreseeable future.

2007 also saw the club reject the proposal of a new 20,000 all seater stadium in an area of the city nicknamed 'The Railway Triangle'. This was intended to be shared with the local football side. Kingsholm was also suggested in October 2007 as a possible temporary home for Gloucester City after their stadium Meadow Park was flooded and then abandoned following the summer floods. This move was, however, rejected by Gloucester Rugby Chairman, Tom Walkinshaw.

In 2017, Gloucester Rugby announced that the Kingsholm Stadium will include a megastore and even museum.

Colours

According to local legend, it was decided that the club's colour was to be entirely navy blue, yet on an away trip they realised they had forgotten to bring sufficient Navy strip for the entire team. Travelling en route via Painswick, they stopped off at the local rugby club and asked to borrow a strip. Painswick RFC loaned them 15 of their cherry-and-white jerseys, the Gloucester side went on to win the away fixture and failed to return the shirts to Painswick, adopting the colours as their own. In 2003, to celebrate Gloucester RFC's 130th anniversary, Gloucester RFC returned the favour and donated Painswick RFC an entire new set of first team colours. Painswick RFC refer to themselves as "The Original Cherry and Whites" in reference to the incident.

For the start of the 2000–01 season, the club introduced new shirts which no longer featured the cherry-and-white hoops, instead featuring a largely red shirt with white sleeves.

The hoops returned in the 2001–02 season, with thin white hoops. In the 2005–06 season, the club moved away from traditional hoops again. The New Jersey was predominantly red, with white panelling on the side in a 'ladder' effect. This was dubbed the 'Spiderman' or 'Arsenal' kit by supporters. The new kit also abandoned the traditional navy blue shorts and socks, with the new design becoming all red.  On the release of the 2005–06 shirt there was a degree of disappointment in Gloucester Rugby's decision to move away from the hooped jersey again (a design generally associated with traditional rugby shirts), as this was a dramatic move away from the classic Gloucester Rugby design. After the new 2005–06 shirt was released, 'Hudsons & Co' of Gloucester city centre, released a classic, plain cherry-and-white-hooped Gloucester Rugby jersey, manufactured by Cotton Traders (who supplied Gloucester Rugby jerseys prior to the 2007–08 season, when the manufacture of kit was taken over by RugbyTech), albeit an unofficial jersey which is not associated with the club, the shirt proved popular with fans unhappy with the official shirt. On the back of this success, many of the Public Houses in the Kingsholm area also began selling shirts with the classic hoops. Although these shirts do not display the name 'Gloucester Rugby', due to copyright, the Hudson variety were labelled 'Gloucester Rugby Football Club' while the pub versions used the title 'Cherry and Whites'. Both designs used the traditional cherry-and-white hoops, with the title under the Gloucester city coat of arms. As such many of the fans who disapproved of the new original design were able to purchase this classic design instead.

A number of fans commented on the irony that, whilst the new crest and shirt design were originally designed in order to prevent unofficial merchandise, they have in fact increased the number of fans turning to unofficial shirts. Gloucester Rugby released its own, official, supporters shirt displaying the classic hooped design with the new club crest above the date of the club's inception '1873'. For the start of the 2009–10 season, the club returned the first team jersey design to the cherry-and-white hoops.

In 2018, Gloucester revealed a new logo.

Kits
For many years, Cotton Oxford and Cotton Traders provided the playing kits for Gloucester. Between the 2007–08 and the 2010–11 seasons, RugbyTech supplied their kits, and between the 2011–12 season and the 2015-16 Kooga supplied the kits.

Australian kit manufacturer XBlades were the kit provider, between 2016 and 2017 and the end of the 2018–19 season. From the 2019-20 season onwards Oxen Sports supplied the kit. BiGDUG, a Gloucester-based shelving company, remained the front of shirt sponsor for the 2022-23 season. while Hartpury appears on each shoulder. Kärcher feature on the lower back of the 2022-23 shirt as well as on the back of the playing shorts. Laithwaites Wine is on the upper back of the shirt. Appsbroker and Google Cloud are the sponsors on the left sleeve. Gloucester’s 2022-23 away shirt contains the same sponsors as the home shirt however it is blue in colour. The European shirt it pink with Bendac, an LED display supplier taking the place of BiGDUG.

In February 2023, Gloucester announced that for the first Slater Cup game held at Kingsholm that they would play in a limited edition Slater Cup shirt. The club also announced that £10 from every shirt sold would go directly to the Slater family to aid Ed’s treatment, and adaptations to his home and provide valuable financial support to his family following his diagnosis with Motor Neurone Disease in July 2022

The shirt was designed by Ed and his family, and contains touches such as '4Dad' above the club logo, while the classic cherries of the 'Cherry & Whites' also appear on the bottom of the shirt. The Slater Cup trophy is on the left sleeve, while a portrait of Ed appears on the right. The classic Gloucester Rugby red remains as the core colour of the new strip, with the number 4, Ed’s position, placed on the front.

Nickname
Gloucester are referred to by fans and media alike as the Cherry and Whites, a reference to the club's colours. Although this is not an official nickname, the club themselves regularly use the nickname in marketing and community messaging, as well as the players through social media. In the early 2010s, the club released an official fan shirt with imagery of cherries and the city's Cathedral on. The history of this nickname being used can be traced to local media references in the 1920s, when the nickname the "Red and Whites" was used, before evolving into the now familiar "Cherry and Whites" nickname during the 1950s/60s.

In 2005, the club decided to abandon its "Cherry and Whites" nickname and changed themselves to Lions instead but no official change was made during the year.

Another unofficial nickname for the club was "The Elver Eaters', although that name is a distant memory mused over by the club's oldest and longest supporters.

Season summaries

Gold background denotes championsSilver background denotes runners-upPink background denotes relegated

* After dropping into the competition from the Champions Cup/Heineken Cup

Club honours

Gloucester Rugby
Premiership Rugby
Runners-up: (4) 1988–89, 1989–90, 2002–03, 2006–07
National Merit Table 'A'
Champions: (1) 1985-86
Zurich Premiership Play-Off
Champions: (1) 2001-02
European Challenge Cup
Champions: (2) 2005–06, 2014–15
Runners-up: (2) 2016–17, 2017–18
Anglo-Welsh Cup
Champions: (5) 1971–72, 1977–78, 1981–82, 2002–03, 2010–11
Runners-up: (3) 1989–90, 2008–09, 2009–10
C&G Cup
Champions: (2) 1997–98, 1998–99
Premiership Rugby Sevens Series
Champions: (2) 2013, 2014
Runners-up: (1) 2012

Gloucester United
Premiership Rugby Shield
Runners-up: (1) 2016–17

Friendly
Middlesex Sevens
Champions: (1) 2005

Current squad

The Gloucester Rugby squad for the 2022–23 season is:

Elite Academy squad
The Gloucester Rugby Elite Academy squad is:

Academy squad
The Gloucester Rugby Academy squad is:

Club staff

First Team Coaching
Alex Brown — Chief Operating Officer
George Skivington — Head Coach
Dominic Waldouck – Defence Coach
Trevor Woodman – Assistant Forwards and Academy Transition Coach
Tim Taylor – Assistant Backs and Academy Transition Coach 
Dan Tobin — Head of Performance
Darren Lewis — Head of Analysis

Academy
Carl Hogg - Director of Academy and Development
Gareth Delve - Senior Academy Manager
Alex Guest – Junior Academy Manager
Kevin Mannion – Academy Performance Manager
Matt Teague – Academy Coach

Notable former players

Below is a non-exhaustive list of former players for the club who have been either club record holders or have been particularly notable during their time at the club.

 
 Mike Teague, played in 1991 Rugby World Cup Final while at Gloucester
 Phil Vickery, won 2003 Rugby World Cup Final while at Gloucester
 Trevor Woodman, won 2003 Rugby World Cup Final while at Gloucester
 John Gordon A'Bear, international rugby union player with the British and Irish Lions, and Gloucester's youngest ever captain
 Ludovic Mercier, club points and goal-kick record holder
 Franco Mostert, won 2019 Rugby World Cup while playing for Gloucester
 Tony Lewis, former England cricket captain

Lions Tourists 
The following Gloucester players have been selected for the Lions tours while at the club:

 Walter Jesse Jackson (1891)
 Frank Stout (1899 & 1903)
 Tom Voyce (1924)
 John Gordon A'Bear (1936)
 P. C. Hordern (1936)
 Don Rutherford (1966)
 Mike Burton (1974)
 Phil Blakeway (1980)
 Steve Boyle (1983)
 Mike Teague (1989 & 1993)
 Phil Vickery (2001)
 Billy Twelvetrees (2013)
 Ross Moriarty (2017)
 Greig Laidlaw (2017)
 Chris Harris (2021)
 Louis Rees-Zammit (2021)

Rugby World Cup 
The following are players which have represented their countries at the Rugby World Cup whilst playing for Gloucester:

Sponsorship

References

External links

 
Live streaming commentary on all games and lots more from BBC Gloucestershire
Gloucester Rugby Heritage
Visitor information on Gloucester for travelling fans – details of where to stay and eating out in Gloucester
Premiership Rugby Official Website

 
Premiership Rugby teams
English rugby union teams
Rugby clubs established in 1873
Sport in Gloucester
1873 establishments in England